Frimmel is a surname. Notable people with the surname include:

Marek Frimmel (born 1992), Slovak football forward
Rainer Frimmel (born 1971), Austrian director and photographer
Sebastian Frimmel (born 1995), Austrian handball player
Theodor von Frimmel (1853–1928), Austrian art historian, musicologist and Beethoven biographer